The 1954 New Hampshire gubernatorial election was held on November 2, 1954. Republican nominee Lane Dwinell defeated Democratic nominee John Shaw with 55.12% of the vote.

Primary elections
Primary elections were held on September 14, 1954.

Candidates 
John Shaw, Mayor of Rochester
Charles R. Eastman, former head of the New Hampshire Grange

Results

Republican primary

Candidates
Lane Dwinell, President of the New Hampshire Senate
Elmer E. Bussey, farmer

Results

General election

Candidates
Lane Dwinell, Republican
John Shaw, Democratic

Results

References

1954
New Hampshire
Gubernatorial